Daniel Manzano Salazar (born 4 December 1972), better known by his stage name Dr Kucho!, is a Spanish house DJ/record producer. He is best known for his 2005 single "Can't Stop Playing" with Gregor Salto. The song was re-released in 2014, remixed by Oliver Heldens and vocals from Ane Brun were added. The song then had success in the UK, reaching number 4 in the charts.

Career
Dr. Kucho started in 2004 releasing “New School Tribal”, a tune with African roots and catchy chants that reached the number 26 of Beatport's house top downloads in just one week, maintaining this position and closers for weeks. It seems that Dr. Kucho has a special drive to start each new year full of energy, as he demonstrated in January 2009 when he released new remixes of “Patricia never leaves the house”, the tune that opened him the doors of UK market in 2001, this re-release with remixes from Dr. Kucho himself, Gregor Salto, Peter Gelderblom and Mike Haddad & Royce Haven was one of the best sellers at Beatport during the beginning of the 2009.

Discography

Singles

References

External links
 Official Site
 Dr. Kucho at Discogs
 Dr. Kucho at MySpace
 Dr. Kucho at Facebook
 Dr. Kucho at Twitter
 Dr. Kucho at Beatwiki
 Dr. Kucho at Beatport
 Dr. Kucho at Traxsource
 Dr. Kucho at SoundCloud
  Interview Dr. Kucho! - Actualites Electroniques
  Interview Dr. Kucho! - Actualites Electroniques

Spanish DJs
Spanish record producers
Living people
1972 births
Musicians from Madrid